Twinkle protein also known as twinkle mtDNA helicase is a mitochondrial protein that in humans is encoded by the TWNK gene (also known as C10orf2 or PEO1) located in the long arm of chromosome 10 (10q24.31).

Twinkle is a mitochondrial protein with structural similarity to the phage T7 primase/helicase (GP4) and other hexameric ring helicases. The twinkle protein colocalizes with mtDNA in mitochondrial nucleoids, and its name derives from the unusual localization pattern reminiscent of twinkling stars. A homolog is found in Arabidopsis thaliana chloroplast and mitochondria.

Discovery 
In 2001, a team was able to identify the C10orf2 gene and named it twinkle due to its localization pattern that resembles twinkling stars.  The presumed main function of twinkle is important for the lifetime regulation of the human mtDNA. The gene is expressed at high levels in skeletal muscles. The gene encodes for a protein that has a full length of 684 units of amino acids. The twinkle protein consists of 3 functional domains: a 5-primase domain, a linker region, and a helicase region. The linker and helicase regions are involved in most of the pathogenic mutations.

Function 
The TWNK gene makes two proteins, Twinkle and Twinky. The proteins Twinkle and Twinky are both found in the mitochondria. Each mitochondrion contains a small amount of DNA which is known as mitochondrial DNA (mtDNA). The Twinkle protein is involved in the production of mtDNA by functioning as an adenine nucleotide dependent DNA helicase, an enzyme that binds to DNA and temporarily unwinds the double helix of the DNA molecule so that it can replicate. They also serve as primases able to initiate DNA replication.

They function as hexameric or heptameric DNA helicases, which unwinds the double-stranded DNA in the 5’ to 3’ direction in short segments. The proteins unwind single-stranded mitochondrial DNA binding protein and mtDNA polymerase gamma. These enzymes function similar to the T7 phage helicase (gp4); however, Twinkle and/ or Twinky are capable of both unwinding and recombining DNA making them bifunctional helicases.

Their functions as a helicase include the binding of both single stranded DNA (ssDNA) and double stranded DNA (dsDNA), and catalyzing DNA unwinding. The energy required for DNA unwinding is supplied by the hydrolysis of ATP to ADP.  It has different binding affinities for each of its specific binding sites when binding either the ssDNA or the dsDNA.

Disease association 
Mutations occurring on the TWNK gene are associated with health conditions such as Perrault Syndrome, ataxia neuropathy spectrum, infantile-onset spinocerebellar ataxia, and most prominently progressive external ophthalmoplegia.

One of the best known mutations of this gene is associated with infantile onset spinocerebellar ataxia or IOSCA.  IOSCA is a neurodegenerative disease whose symptoms appear in children after one year of age. The symptoms of this disease include ataxia, muscle hypertonia, loss of deep-tendon reflexes, and athetosis and later on in the child's life hearing loss, psychotic behavior, sensory axonal neutrophil ataxia, and additional neurological development problems. Before age one, a child develops normally and then the child starts to experience neurological deficits.

Clinical significance 
The twinkle gene is an important protein that is involved in the synthesis and maintenance of mtDNA. The gene is located in the mitochondrial matrix and mitochondrial nucleotides. Twinkle protein serves as the mitochondrial DNA helicase that binds to DNA and aids in unwinding the double helix of the DNA molecules. By allowing unwinding of the double helix, replication of mtDNA is achieved. Any form of mutation in twinkle protein can result in mtDNA disease. The disease can be categorized into two groups. The first category includes disease that impairs the respiratory function due to the primary mutation of the mtDNA; the second category is usually known as mtDNA maintenance disease. The cause of mtDNA maintenance diseases is the dysfunction of the replication and maintenance apparatus of mtDNA, programmed by nuclear genes. Infantile onset spinocerebellar ataxia (IOSCA) and progressive external ophthalmoplegia (PEO) are associated with multiple deletions of mtDNA.  PEO in humans and most mammals is associated with an eye disorder which involves the individual gradually losing the ability to move the eyes as well as the eyebrows. These disorders in recent times have been established to be occurring in the population, with the frequencies of single mutation projected to increase.

Transgenic mice expressing both human PEO patient mutations and the wild-type mouse twinkle protein have progressive respiratory chain dysfunction due to accumulation of mtDNA deletions, but the phenotype does not reduce lifespan.

References

Further reading